Eurysphindus is a genus of cryptic slime mold beetles in the family Sphindidae. There are about eight described species in Eurysphindus.

Species
These eight species belong to the genus Eurysphindus:
 Eurysphindus bicolor Fisher
 Eurysphindus brasiliensis Sen Gupta & Crowson, 1979
 Eurysphindus comatulus McHugh, 1993
 Eurysphindus grandiclaviger McHugh, 1993
 Eurysphindus halli McHugh, 1993
 Eurysphindus hirtus LeConte, 1878
 Eurysphindus infuscus McHugh, 1993
 Eurysphindus plaumanni Sen Gupta & Crowson, 1979

References

Further reading

 
 

Sphindidae
Articles created by Qbugbot